Ellen Aline Fenner (b. July 1888, Huntington, West Virginia) was an American botanist and mycologist known for first describing the genus Mycotypha.

References 

1888 births
American women scientists
American botanists
Year of death missing
People from Huntington, West Virginia